Thérèse de Moëlien (1759–1793) was a French counter-revolutionary and agent during the French Revolution.

She was the cousin of the counter revolutionary Charles Armand Tuffin, marquis de la Rouërie. She was a member and financier of the counter-revolutionary organisation Association Bretonne and active in gaining supporters for it. After the arrest of Tuffin she was arrested and executed by guillotine.

References
 Geoffroy Dauvergne, Les Amazones de la Chouannerie, fresque peinte dans le réfectoire du Collège Théophile Briant à Tinténiac, 1955.

1759 births
1793 deaths
People executed by guillotine during the French Revolution
Women in 18th-century warfare
Women in war in France